The episodes of Canaan (stylized as CANAAN) are directed by Masahiro Ando and created under the direction of the Project CANAAN group with Kinoko Nasu being the scenario director P.A. Works did the animation for Canaan. The show officially broadcast its first episode on July 4, 2009 to September 26, 2009 on the AT-X, Chiba TV, Kansai TV, Tokai TV, Tokyo MX TV, TV Kanagawa and TV Saitama television stations.

Based on a bonus scenario created by Type-Moon for the game 428: Shibuya Scramble, Canaan'''s story is based on its eponymous protagonist. A Middle Eastern teenaged girl and a mercenary, Canaan is dispatched by her unknown superiors to the city of Shanghai in the People's Republic of China where she meets up with Maria Ōsawa. Now a photographer, Maria reunites with her friend Canaan after being saved from harassment during a trip to the Middle East years ago. Unknown to her, Maria suffers from partial amnesia since she had been the target of an attack by mysterious terrorists in Shibuya, Tokyo who planted with the Ua virus in her before her father Kenji was able to save her life by using an anti-Ua virus vaccine created by the Okoshi Pharmaceutical company. Their presence in Shanghai, however, has been greatly overshadowed by the upcoming NBCR International Anti-Terrorist Conference in the same city where Alphard, Canaan's hated rival, plans to stage a terrorist attack with her subordinates known as "Snakes".

The creation of Canaan was first announced in the November issue of Newtype magazine that 428: Shibuya Scramble would have an anime adaptation. The show's title was later officially announced on 428: Shibuya Scramble's official website with P.A. Works doing the animation. A 17-second commercial was later aired on the show's official website. Comp Ace magazine had announced on a flyer that its July issue will serialize Canaans manga adaptation. Canaan is also scheduled to have a movie adaptation in October, in where all of its 13 episodes are compiled into one show. Canaan was released on Region 2 DVDs and in Blu-Rays on October 21, 2009, with the DVD being sold for ¥6,090 and the Blu-Ray for ¥7,140. As of 2012, there is no word about the Canaan OVAs.

The first two volumes of Canaan was released in the DVD and Blu-ray formats simultaneously on October 21 and on November 27, 2009. There were subsequent releases of Canaan on DVD and Blu-ray on November 29 and December 25 of 2009, followed by January 29, February 26 and March 17 of 2010. Canaan was released in a DVD/Blu-ray Collection for North America by Sentai Filmworks on October 26, 2010 for $69.98. A Complete Blu-Ray Collection by Sentai will be released on January 4, 2022.

The show's opening song, "mind as Judgment", is sung by Faylan with a single released on July 22, 2009. The ending song, "My heaven", is sung by Annabel with a single released on August 26, 2009. However, the opening song was not used in episode 11, See Saw. Episode 13, Land of Hope', did not have an opening song as well and "mind as Judgment" was used for the episode's ending song. A separate single, was released on October 7, 2009 with the songs performed by Ayahi Takagaki, who played Nene in the series. An album, "CANAAN Inspired Album", was released on November 11, 2009 containing 10 tracks with the "mind as Judgment" ballad remix song. The Canaan'' OST was released on November 25, 2009 with 3 discs included.

Episodes

References

Canaan (anime)